The 1975–76 Buffalo Sabres season was the Sabres' sixth season in the National Hockey League (NHL).

Offseason

Regular season

Final standings

Schedule and results

Playoffs

Preliminary Round

Quarterfinals

Player statistics

Awards and records

Transactions

Draft picks
Buffalo's draft picks at the 1975 NHL Amateur Draft held in Montreal, Quebec.

Farm teams

See also
1975–76 NHL season

References

Buffalo Sabres seasons
Buffalo
Buffalo
Buffalo
Buffalo